Everything in Between is the second studio album from the noise rock band No Age. It was released in 2010 on Sub Pop, their second album on the company. Its first single was "Glitter". The album's artwork was designed by Brian Roettinger, who also designed the artwork for Nouns.

In late August, Sub Pop posted a trailer on their Vimeo page for the album featuring a leather bound figure pumping a device to the beat of "Life Prowler". On September 21, No Age released the album for streaming on The Guardian website. It was ranked the 13th best album of 2010 by Pitchfork.

Track listing

References

No Age albums
2010 albums
Sub Pop albums